is a former Japanese  handball player who competed in the 1976 Summer Olympics.

References

1949 births
Living people
Japanese male handball players
Olympic handball players of Japan
Handball players at the 1976 Summer Olympics
Place of birth missing (living people)